Rugby union at the 1983 South Pacific Games, currently known as the Pacific Games, was hosted at Apia, the capital of Western Samoa in September 1983. Fiji beat the host nation Western Samoa by 18–10 in the final to win the gold medal.

Medal summary

Teams
Competing teams were:

 Pool A
 
 
 
 
 
 

 Pool B

Group matches

Group A

Note: Records for this tournament are incomplete.

Western Samoa and Tonga qualified for the finals.

Group B

Note: Records for this tournament are incomplete.

Fiji and New Caledonia qualified for the finals.

Play-offs

See also
 Rugby union at the Pacific Games

References

rugby union
1983
International rugby union competitions hosted by Samoa
1983 rugby union tournaments for national teams